Daniel Fernandes (born 2 August 1984) is an Indian stand-up comedian. Based in Mumbai, Fernandes is known for his dark and surreal style of comedy, with references to social issues in India.

Early life

Fernandes was born in Mumbai and was raised in Goa. He received his MBA in marketing from Symbiosis Institute of Media & Communication, Pune.

Career

Based in Mumbai, Fernandes regularly performs at comedy clubs including Canvas Laugh Club, The Comedy Store, Blue Frog and High Spirits. In his comedic material and interviews, Fernandes is known to cover Indian social issues including free speech, student suicide, death penalty and marital rape. He collaborated with several Indian stand-up comedians including Gursimran Khamba, Aditi Mittal, Biswa Kalyan Rath, Sundeep Rao, Radhika Vaz, Abish Mathew and Kanan Gill.

In October 2015, Fernandes accompanied Nawazuddin Siddiqui for promotions of the 2015 biographical film, Manjhi: The Mountain Man. In March 2015, he  hosted Forbes India's entrepreneurial awards event, 30Under30.

References

External links

Indian male comedians
Living people
Artists from Mumbai
1984 births
Indian stand-up comedians
Goan people